The play-offs of the 2014 Fed Cup Asia/Oceania Zone Group I were the final stages of the Group I Zonal Competition involving teams from Asia and Oceania. Using the positions determined in their pools, the seven teams faced off to determine their placing in the 2014 Fed Cup Asia/Oceania Zone Group I. The top two teams advanced to World Group II Play-offs, and the bottom two teams were relegated down to the Asia/Oceania Zone Group II.

Pool results

Promotion play-off 
The first placed teams of the two pools were drawn in head-to-head rounds. The winner advanced to the World Group II Play-offs.

Thailand vs. Uzbekistan

3rd place play-off
The second placed teams of the two pools were drawn in head-to-head rounds to find third place teams.

Kazakhstan vs. China

Relegation play-off 
The last placed teams of the two pools were drawn in head-to-head rounds. The loser was relegated down to Asia/Oceania Zone Group II in 2015.

Indonesia vs. Chinese Taipei

Final placements 

  advanced to World Group II play-offs.
  were relegated to Asia/Oceania Group II in 2015.

See also 
 Fed Cup structure

References

External links 
 Fed Cup website

P1